Antonín Dvořák's Serenade for Strings in E major, Op. 22 (B. 52), is one of the composer's most popular orchestral works. It was composed in just two weeks in May 1875.

Composition and premiere
By 1875, Dvořák was gaining recognition as a composer. He received a generous stipend from a commission in Vienna, allowing him to write the Serenade, in addition to Symphony No. 5, String Quintet No. 2, Piano Trio No. 1, the opera Vanda, and the Moravian Duets. Dvořák is said to have written the Serenade in just 12 days, from 3 to 14 May.

The piece premiered in Prague on 10 December 1876 by Adolf Čech and the combined orchestras of the Czech and German theatres. Dvořák's piano duet arrangement was published in Prague in 1877 by Emanuel Starý. Two years later, Bote & Bock published the score in Berlin.

Form
Dvořák's Serenade for Strings consists of five movements:

With the exception of the finale, which is in modified sonata form, each movement follows a rough ABA form. It is believed that Dvořák took up this small orchestral genre because it was less demanding than the symphony, but allowed for the provision of pleasure and entertainment. The piece combines cantabile style (first movement), a slow waltz (second movement), humorous high spirits (third movement), lyrical beauty (fourth movement) and exuberance (fifth movement).

Scoring

The work is scored for full string orchestra, with staves for Violin I & 2, Viola, Cello and Contrabass (double bass). It is typically performed with 4–6 instruments per part, though usually 2 or 3 double basses are sufficient.

Description of movements

I. Moderato

The first movement starts off the Serenade in the key of E major. The second violins and cellos introduce the lyrical main theme over an eighth note pulse in the violas. The theme is traded back and forth, and the second violins reprise it under a soaring passage in the firsts.

At measure 31, the movement modulates into G major and presents a new, dancelike theme, based on a dotted rhythm. At measure 54, the movement modulates back into E major and the primary theme returns. The movement ends on three E major chords.

II. Tempo di Valse

The second movement, a waltz, opens with a lilting dance melody in C minor. The first section repeats, and the second section begins in E Mixolydian. A string of eighth notes in the violins transitions into the second theme in A major. The first theme returns, and Part A is closed with a cadential fortissimo C-sharp minor chord.

Part B opens with a modulation into the enharmonic parallel major of D major. This section's theme is developed, and then Part A returns. The movement ends on a C major chord.

III. Scherzo: Vivace

The third movement is a lively, hyperactive Scherzo in F major. The theme is stated and subsequently developed in sections of different tempos and moods, including a foray into A major. The most monothematic movement yet, the scherzo ends with a coda combining material from the scherzo and trio.

IV. Larghetto

The slow movement of the Serenade is tranquil and wistful. Its flowing melodies and tender phrases form a buffer between the vigorous third and fifth movements. The third theme of the second movement is quoted repeatedly throughout.

V. Finale: Allegro vivace

The fifth movement is a lively, offbeat finale, conveying the spirit of a Bohemian village dance. The principal theme is a descending figure based on thirds with accents on weak beats. More thematic material enters at bar 32 as the violins and cellos trade calls and responses over running eighths in the violas. A third theme based primarily on sixteenth-note upbeats appears at bar 87. A wistful recollection of the melody from the preceding Larghetto appears and then diminuendos away.

The movement's recapitulation starts with the main theme, followed in turn by the second and third themes. A 20-bar eighth-note passage leads into a quotation of the first movement's theme, bringing the piece full circle. A Presto coda follows, and the Serenade ends with three E major chords.

Quotes and interpretation

See also
 Serenade for Strings (Elgar)
 Serenade for Strings (Tchaikovsky)

References

Dvořák, Antonín: Serenata, Op. 22. Partitura. (Score) Praha: Editio Bärenreiter, 2000. H 971

External links
 Serenade for Strings on a comprehensive Dvorak site
 Piece details, Portland Chamber Orchestra
 Program Notes, Kremlin Chamber Orchestra
 

Compositions by Antonín Dvořák
Dvorak
Compositions for string orchestra
1875 compositions
Compositions in E major